The 1986–87 Texas A&M Aggies men's basketball team represented Texas A&M University as a member of the Southwest Conference during the 1986–87 college basketball season. The team was led by head coach Shelby Metcalf and played their home games at G. Rollie White Coliseum in College Station, Texas.  After finishing 8th in the conference regular season standings, the Aggies went on a surprise run and won the SWC tournament to receive the conference's automatic bid to the NCAA tournament. As No. 12 seed in the Midwest region, Texas A&M was beaten by Duke in the opening round. The Aggies finished with a record of 17–14 (6–10 SWC).

Roster 

Source:

Schedule and results

|-
!colspan=9 style=| Regular season

|-
!colspan=9 style=| SWC Tournament

|-
!colspan=9 style=| NCAA Tournament

Sources:

References

Texas A&M Aggies men's basketball seasons
Texas AandM
Texas A and M Aggies men's b
Texas A and M Aggies men's b
Texas AandM